Árni beiskur or Árni the Bitter (died 22 October 1253;;) was an Icelander. He was a follower of Gissur Þorvaldsson who undertook the task of killing Snorri Sturluson.

Íslendinga saga reports the event in an almost newspaper style:

After that they discovered where Snorri was and those entered the cellar: Markús Marðarson, Símon knútur, Árni beiskur, Þorsteinn Guðinason, Þórarinn Ásgrímsson. Símon knútur asked Árni beiskur to kill him.Thou shalt not hew, said Snorri.Hew thou, said Símon.Thou shalt not hew, said Snorri.Then Árni dealt him a fatal blow, and after that both he and Þorsteinn added further injuries.It would have been an act of irony, if the killer of Iceland's greatest writer of the Middle Ages had escaped punishment. He didn't.

He was captured in another battle and executed (Flugumýrarbrenna). He didn't ask for mercy, and the last words spoken of him were those of Kolbeinn Dufgusson: Nobody remembers Snorri Sturluson, if you are to be spared.Árni beiskur is otherwise an obscure character in Icelandic history, but his own last words, as recorded, point to a certain strength of character. In the words of Íslendinga saga, after he had run out from Flugumýrarbrenna, being aged, he stumbled and lay defenseless:Árni beiskur is here, says he, and I will not ask for clemency. I also see that not far from me lies another whom I wish to follow.'' (The one lying beside him was Hallur Gissurarson, son of Gissur Þorvaldsson).

13th-century Icelandic people
1253 deaths
Year of birth unknown
Place of birth unknown